Seven Songs may refer to

Literature
Merlin Book 2: The Seven Songs, a 1997 book by T. A. Barron

Music
Seven Songs, Op. 17 (Sibelius), 1891–1904
 Seven Songs (album), a 1982 album by 23 Skidoo
 Seven Songs for Quartet and Chamber Orchestra, a 1974 album by Gary Burton

See also

Seven Songs from the Tundra, a 1999 Finnish film 
Seven Songs for Malcolm X, a 1993 British documentary film 
 Seven Early Songs (Berg)(c. 1905–1908), musical compositions of Alban Berg
Seven Songs as Unpretentious as the Wild Rose, a 1901 collection of songs by Carrie Jacobs-Bond
Seven Romances on Poems by Alexander Blok, a 1967 vocal-instrumental suite by Shostakovich
Songs and Proverbs of William Blake, a 1965 song cycle of seven songs by Benjamin Britten 
Seven Danish Songs, an 1897 composition by Frederick Delius
Siete canciones populares españolas (Seven Spanish Folksongs), a 1914 set of traditional Spanish songs arranged by Manuel de Falla
Seven Songs Seldom Seen, a 1992 video by Toad the Wet Sprocket
Seven songs from Walter Scott's Lady of the Lake, a song cycle by Schubert, Op 52 
Seven Songs for Planet Earth, a 2011 composition by Olli Kortekangas
 Rückert-Lieder, a 1901–2 song cycle by Mahler, first published in Seven Songs of Latter Days